Pain and suffering is the legal term for the physical and emotional stress caused from an injury (see also pain and suffering).

Some damages that might come under this category would be: aches, temporary and permanent limitations on activity, potential shortening of life, depression or scarring.  When filing a lawsuit as a result of an injury, it is common for someone to seek money both in compensation for actual money that is lost and for the pain and stress associated with virtually any injury.  In a suit, pain and suffering is part of the "general damages" section of the claimant's claim, or, alternatively, it is an element of "compensatory" non-economic damages that allows recovery for the mental anguish and/or physical pain endured by the claimant as a result of injury for which the plaintiff seeks redress.

Apart from money damages awarded in trial, money damages are also given informally outside the judicial system in mediations, arbitration (both of which may be court annexed or non litigated claims) as well as in routine insurance settlements. Individual claimants or those represented by lawyers often present demands to insurers to settle for money. These demand for bodily injury compensation monies often set out damages that are similarly used in the court litigated pleadings. Demands are usually written summaries of a claimant's medical care and the facts which resulted in the injury.

Size of settlement

The settlement a person receives for their pain and suffering depends on many factors.  This includes the severity of the injury, type of medical treatment received, the length of recovery time, and potential long term consequences of the personal injuries.  In addition to physical pain, claimants can also cite emotional and psychological trauma in their pain and suffering claims.  For example, a visible scar on the face can lead to painful feelings of constant embarrassment and insecurity.

The amount of money damages a claimant gets for pain and suffering will also depend upon the amount claimed in a lawsuit if such is filed or the amount demanded to the responsible party in the underlying claim if it is an insurance claim. Even though a lawyer representing a client in an injury negligence-based lawsuit may claim a certain amount for pain and suffering, the jury or the insurance adjuster will award pain and suffering money for differing reasons. In practice, historically tort cases involving personal injury often involve contingent fees, with attorneys being paid a portion of the pain and suffering damages; one commentator says a typical split of pain and suffering is one-third for the lawyer, one-third for the physician, and one-third for the plaintiff.

Jury awards for pain and suffering may vary depending upon socio-economic and political factors within the community from which the jury is drawn. In most states the maximum monetary amount awarded for pain and suffering is capped at what is listed in the particular suit or written complaint. In some jurisdictions there are maximum amounts set in law which a jury may not exceed in awarding damages.

The personality of the plaintiff, their witnesses and overall effect of the injuries which befell the victim plaintiff will play a powerful role in any damage award if damages are even awarded once liability issues are satisfied. The power and personality of the lawyer representing her or his client also may factor into a high money damage award case.

Such awards may follow in house insurance guidelines with some leeway granted to adjusters to adjust the claim in order to prevent the claim from being fully litigated in court. There is a wide range of levels of compensation which may fluctuate seasonally and with the economy and dictates of the insurance industry setting the varying levels of compensation to claimants. Some insurers have experimented with using computers which tabulate the data that is presented and grant the adjuster a level of money authority for which to settle the claim.

In the Western world these awards are typically discretionary awards made by juries and are regarded as difficult to predict, variable and subjective, for instance in the US, UK, Australia and New Zealand.

See also
 Hedonic damages
 Psychological trauma

References

Legal terminology